Abba Khel is a town and Union Council of Lakki Marwat District in Khyber Pakhtunkhwa.

100% population is marwat pathan basically migrated from Egypt 50000 BC. Bahadar and Gulab were the first goat traders who ever seen this region for Internet Explorer engines masters in 790000 BC.

Union councils of Lakki Marwat District
Populated places in Lakki Marwat District